Peters Ice Cream is an Australian ice cream brand, now a subsidiary of European food firm Froneri. It was originally developed by an expatriate American, Frederick (Fred) Augustus Bolles Peters in 1907, using his mother's recipe.

History 
The company was established in 1907 at Paddington, New South Wales as the Peters' American Delicacy Company. New works to manufacture 'The Health food of a Nation' was opened at neighbouring Redfern in 1923. Business flourished, in 1927 he set up Peters' Arctic Delicacy Co. Ltd in Brisbane and a branch in Newcastle; followed by, in 1929, associated companies were established in Victoria, Western Australia and at Townsville with manufacturing branch at Queensland. Peters was largely responsible for introducing to Australia the small refrigerated cabinet, which he hired out to retailers. The red and cream corporate identity was adopted in New South Wales and Queensland, whilst green and cream were used in Victoria and Western Australia . The hub of the company, in Australia was a food firm known as Petersville Australia Limited, in the Melbourne suburb of Mulgrave, which later became the factory, which remains the production centre for most of its ice-cream products.

The company was taken over by Adelaide Steamship Company (AdSteam) in the late 1980s, and then by Pacific Dunlop (now known as Ansell) upon AdSteam's collapse. Pacific Dunlop sold its food assets in the mid-1990s, and the ice-cream division was acquired by Nestlé, which continued to market brands including Choc-Wedge, Drumstick, and Monaco Bar.

Ownership of a separate Peters Ice Cream business in Western Australia passed as part of Peters and Brownes (PB) Foods to Fonterra in 2006 and to Nestlé in 2009, giving Nestlé nationwide control of the brand.  Formerly, Peters in Western Australia exported ice-creams to Japan where it was called Lady Borden, and New Zealand where it was called Tip Top. Since 2009, Peters ice-creams have been trucked into WA from Melbourne, but the former PB Balcatta factory still produces Cadbury ice cream.

In 2012, The Peters Ice Cream business, including its Mulgrave factory, was purchased by Pacific Equity Partners (PEP), with licence to produce sub-brands that were retained by Nestlé, e.g., Drumstick. In May 2014, the European company R&R Ice Cream bought Peters.

On April 19, 2018, the transaction to create Froneri, a joint venture between the owner of R&R Ice Cream, PAI Partners and Nestlé was completed.

Gallery

See also
Michelides Tobacco Factory, a building which was for a while the Peters Ice Cream factory in Perth, Western Australia.
Zig and Zag (Australian performers), a clown duo who advertised Peters Ice Cream

References

 Australian Dictionary of Biography, by G.P.Walsh - Volume 11 (MUP), 1988

External links

Froneri Limited
Fred Peters biography

Australian brands
Ice cream brands
Dairy products companies of Australia
Australian subsidiaries of foreign companies
Froneri